Undulation may refer to:

 Lateral undulation, the most primitive of vertebrate locomotor patterns
 Undulation of the geoid, the separation between the geoid and the reference ellipsoid of the Earth
 Undulation point, a point on a curve where the curvature vanishes but does not change sign 
 In botany, a wave shaped part such as a leaf